Hafeez Ullah Khan Niazi is a Pakistani television analyst and columnist who currently appears as an analyst on Report Card on Geo News.

Early life and family
Hafeez Ullah Niazi is the cousin of former Prime Minister of Pakistan Imran Khan. His brother, Najeebullah Khan Niazi, was a politician and member of the Punjab Assembly. His second brother, Inamullah Niazi, is a politician and served as a member of the National Assembly of Pakistan. He is basically an engineer of University of Engineering and Technology Taxila (UET Taxila)

His son Hassaan Niazi, is a lawyer of Imran Khan and he is married to the daughter of the Khan of Oghi. Hafeez's daughter has married into the former royal family of Swat.

Career
He contested 2002 Pakistani general election for PP-44 Mianwali as a candidate of Pakistan Tehreek-e-Insaf, which he lost.

In October 2019, he was banned by PEMRA for 30 days. Following the ban, he challenged the decision of PEMRA. Later, the Lahore High Court suspended the ban.

References

1966 births
Living people
Pakistani journalists
Pakistani columnists
Niazi family